Sorvik or variant, may refer to:

Places
 Sørvik, Harstad Municipality, Troms og Finnmark, Norway
 Sörvik, Ludvika Municipality, Dalarna County, Sweden

People
 Birger Sörvik (1879–1978), Swedish Olympic gymnast
 Daniel Sørvik (born 1990), Norwegian ice hockey player
 Haakon Sörvik (1886–1970), Swedish Olympic gymnast
 Leif Sörvik (1889–1963), Swedish Olympic rower
 Terje Sørvik (born 1967), Norwegian politician

See also